Anzar Shah Kashmiri (1927-2008) was an Indian Islamic scholar who established the Jamia Imam Anwar Shah and co-founded the Darul Uloom Waqf in Deoband.

Shah was an alumnus of the Darul Uloom Deoband. He was youngest son of Hanafi scholar Anwar Shah Kashmiri.

Biography
Anzar Shah Kashmiri was born at Deoband on 6 December 1927. His father Anwar Shah Kashmiri was a scholar of ahadith. He graduated from the Darul Uloom Deoband where he studied with Izaz Ali Amrohi and Hussain Ahmed Madani.

In 1982, Shah co-founded the Darul Uloom Waqf, Deoband. He established the Jamia Imam Anwar Shah in 1997.
He was appointed the vice president of the Uttar Pradesh Congress in 2004. He received the Presidential Certificate of Honor in 2003 for his contributions to the Arabic language and literature.

Death and legacy
Kashmiri suffered from heart and kidney problems for some years and was being treated at Sir Ganga Ram Hospital in Delhi. He died on Saturday 26 April 2008 in Delhi.

He was buried in Deoband next to the grave of his father Anwar Shah Kashmiri and was survived by wife, six daughters and a son Ahmad Khizar Shah Kashmiri, the chancellor of Jamia Imam Anwar Shah, Deoband,

Literary works
Anzar Shah Kashmiri’s books include:
Taqreer-e-Shahi (Tafsir)
Al-fayz ul Jaari (Arabic)
 Asma-e-Husna Ki Barkaat
 Nawaderat Imam Kashmiri
Tadhkira-tul-Izaz (biography of Izaz Ali Amrohi).
Laal-o-Gul
Naqsh-e-Dawam
 Khayr al-Majalis

See also
 Fuzail Ahmad Nasiri

References

1927 births
2008 deaths
Deobandis
Hanafis
Maturidis
Indian Sunni Muslim scholars of Islam
People from Deoband
Darul Uloom Deoband alumni